Supafest was an annual music festival held in Australia during April, created by Paper Chase Touring and Entertainment PTY LTD. It started in 2010, spreading out to in five major capital cities (Adelaide, Brisbane, Melbourne, Perth, Sydney), though in 2011 the festival was reduced to four shows with the Adelaide leg withdrawn as well as the second show in Sydney. Dubbed as Australia's largest urban music festival, the festival promises to deliver some of the most exciting and leading performers in the urban music world.

History
The festival began in 2010 with an announcement in December 2009 introducing the "Ladies And Gentlemen Tour", scheduled for February 2010 with Ne-Yo, Pitbull, Kelly Rowland and Chris Sorbello. After this was announced the show was renamed into "Jamfest" in February 2010 and was rescheduled for April 2010. Due to a potential legal conflict, the promoters changed the name again to "Supafest".

Supafest Australia kicked off in Adelaide, 13 April 2010 and ended in Perth on 18 April 2010. The tours headlining acts were Akon, Kelly Rowland, Jay Sean, Sean Paul, Pitbull and Eve. Each city had separate opening acts. Tickets for the Sydney show on 15 April were quickly sold out. A second show in Sydney on 16 April had been scheduled due to ticket demands. The organisers of the festival expanded the Supafest to one show outside of Australia and tried to place it at Colombo, Sri Lanka but was later cancelled. Akon didn't get a Visa for Sri Lanka.

Since 2010 the lineups have expanded and the structure and locations of the shows have changed to accommodate the crowd figures.

In 2013, the Supafest was postponed from April to November, and then ended up never happening at all without a trace.

In 2016, Paper Chase Touring was listed as "deregistered" on the ASIC website.

Tour dates and artist lineups

2010
 13 April 2010 – Wayville Showgrounds, Adelaide
 14 April 2010 – Royal Melbourne Showgrounds, Melbourne
 15 April 2010 – Acer Arena, Sydney
 16 April 2010 – Acer Arena, Sydney
 17 April 2010 – RNA Showgrounds, Brisbane
 18 April 2010 – ME Bank Stadium, Perth

2011
 9 April 2011 – ANZ Stadium, Sydney
 10 April 2011 – Joondalup Arena, Perth
 16 April 2011 – RNA Showgrounds, Brisbane
 17 April 2011 – Melbourne Showgrounds, Melbourne

2012
 14 April 2012 – RNA Showgrounds, Brisbane
 15 April 2012 – ANZ Stadium, Sydney
 21 April 2012 – Melbourne Showgrounds, Melbourne
 22 April 2012 – Joondalup Arena, Perth

See also

List of hip hop music festivals
Hip hop culture
List of Kelly Rowland live performances

References

External links

Concert tours
Hip hop music festivals
Music festivals in Australia
Summer festivals
Music festivals established in 2010